Redoubt Four was a supporting defensive position of Fort Putnam during the Revolutionary War defensive network at West Point.  It was constructed under the command of Tadeusz Kosciuszko in 1778-1779.  During the war, it was a key defensive overwatch position for Fort Putnam 300 feet below, which was in turn the key overwatch position for Fort Clinton. According to Benedict Arnold, the fort required approximately 100 soldiers to man it.  The redoubt was partially restored in 1975-1976 as part of the bicentennial celebration.  It can be accessed by foot year round from Patrick Trail (road) approximately .5 miles from the West Point Post Exchange complex.

Construction
"The possession of the Hill appears to me essential to the preservation of the whole post and our main effort ought to be directed to keeping the enemy off of it...", George Washington wrote in July 1779, vindicating Tadeusz Kościuszko's decision to place a redoubt on Rocky Hill.

See also
Constitution Island
Kosciuszko's Garden

References

Redoubts
United States Military Academy
1778 establishments in New York (state)